Joana Sainz Garcia (1989 – September 1, 2019) was a Spanish singer, dancer, and songwriter from Madrid, Spain. She was killed in a stage explosion on September 1, 2019.

Biography 
Garcia was raised in Santander, a port city on Spain's north coast in the Cantabria region. She later moved to Suances, also in Cantabria. "The first time I saw her, when she came, I realized her virtues. She was a girl with a lot of energy, with a lot of desire. From the beginning, I saw her a dancer,” Garcia's teacher, Marta Rojo, told El Español. Rojo remembered that Garcia started formal dance training in 2010.

Sainz was the principal dancer and chief choreographer of Spain's Super Hollywood Orchestra. The group were known for their exciting performances which used many special effects, including fireworks.

Joana Sainz died on September 1, 2019 while performing in front of an audience of 1000 people, at a four-day music festival at Las Berlanas. A pyrotechnic device used during the performance exploded next to her. She was struck in the stomach by a faulty cartridge used in the pyrotechnic device.

References

1989 births
2019 deaths
Spanish female dancers
Spanish women singer-songwriters
Spanish singer-songwriters
Deaths by explosive device
Women choreographers
Spanish choreographers
Accidental deaths in Spain
21st-century Spanish dancers
People from Santander, Spain
Musicians who died on stage